Neuropsychiatry or Organic Psychiatry is a branch of medicine that deals with psychiatry as it relates to neurology, in an effort to understand and attribute behavior to the interaction of neurobiology and social psychology factors. Within neuropsychiatry, the mind is considered "as an emergent property of the brain", whereas other behavioral and neurological specialties might consider the two as separate entities. Neuropsychiatry preceded the current disciplines of psychiatry and neurology, which previously had common training, however, those disciplines have subsequently diverged and are typically practiced separately.

Currently, neuropsychiatry has become a growing subspecialty of psychiatry as it closely relates the fields of neuropsychology and behavioral neurology, and attempts to utilize this understanding to better treat illnesses that fall under both neurological and mental disorder classifications (e.g., autism, ADHD, Tourette's syndrome).

The case for the rapprochement of neurology and psychiatry
Given the considerable overlap between these subspecialities, there has been a resurgence of interest and debate relating to neuropsychiatry in academia over the last decade.
Most of this work argues for a rapprochement of neurology and psychiatry, forming a specialty above and beyond a subspecialty of psychiatry. For example, Professor Joseph B. Martin, former Dean of Harvard Medical School and a neurologist by training, has summarized the argument for reunion: "the separation of the two categories is arbitrary, often influenced by beliefs rather than proven scientific observations. And the fact that the brain and mind are one makes the separation artificial anyway." These points and some of the other major arguments are detailed below.

Mind/brain monism
Neurologists have focused objectively on organic nervous system pathology, especially of the brain, whereas psychiatrists have laid claim to illnesses of the mind. This antipodal distinction between brain and mind as two different entities has characterized many of the differences between the two specialties. However, it has been argued that this division is fictional; evidence from the last century of research has shown that our mental life has its roots in the brain. Brain and mind have been argued not to be discrete entities but just different ways of looking at the same system (Marr, 1982). It has been argued that embracing this mind/brain monism may be useful for several reasons. First, rejecting dualism implies that all mentation is biological, which provides a common research framework in which understanding and treatment of mental disorders can be advanced. Second, it mitigates widespread confusion about the legitimacy of mental illness by suggesting that all disorders should have a footprint in the brain.

In sum, a reason for the division between psychiatry and neurology was the distinction between mind or first-person experience and the brain. That this difference is taken to be artificial by proponents of mind/brain monism supports a merge between these specialties.

Causal pluralism
One of the reasons for the divide is that neurology traditionally looks at the causes of disorders from an "inside-the-skin" perspective (neuropathology, genetics) whereas psychiatry looks at "outside-the-skin" causation (personal, interpersonal, cultural). This dichotomy is argued not to be instructive and authors have argued that it is better conceptualized as two ends of a causal continuum. The benefits of this position are: firstly, understanding of etiology will be enriched, in particular between brain and environment. One example is eating disorders, which have been found to have some neuropathology (Uher and Treasure, 2005) but also show increased incidence in rural Fijian school girls after exposure to television (Becker, 2004). Another example is schizophrenia, the risk for which may be considerably reduced in a healthy family environment (Tienari et al., 2004).

It is also argued that this augmented understanding of etiology will lead to better remediation and rehabilitation strategies through an understanding of the different levels in the causal process where one can intervene. It may be that non-organic interventions, like cognitive behavioral therapy (CBT), better attenuate disorders alone or in conjunction with drugs. Linden's (2006) demonstration of how psychotherapy has neurobiological commonalities with pharmacotherapy is a pertinent example of this and is encouraging from a patient perspective as the potentiality for pernicious side effects is decreased while self-efficacy is increased.

In sum, the argument is that an understanding of the mental disorders must not only have a specific knowledge of brain constituents and genetics (inside-the-skin) but also the context (outside-the-skin) in which these parts operate (Koch and Laurent, 1999). Only by joining neurology and psychiatry, it is argued, can this nexus be used to reduce human suffering.

Organic basis
To further sketch psychiatry's history shows a departure from structural neuropathology, relying more upon ideology (Sabshin, 1990). A good example of this is Tourette syndrome, which Ferenczi (1921), although never having seen a patient with Tourette syndrome, suggested was the symbolic expression of masturbation caused by sexual repression. However, starting with the efficacy of neuroleptic drugs in attenuating symptoms (Shapiro, Shapiro and Wayne, 1973) the syndrome has gained pathophysiological support (e.g. Singer, 1997) and is hypothesized to have a genetic basis too, based on its high inheritability (Robertson, 2000). This trend can be seen for many hitherto traditionally psychiatric disorders (see table) and is argued to support reuniting neurology and psychiatry because both are dealing with disorders of the same system.

Improved patient care
Further, it is argued that this nexus will allow a more refined nosology of mental illness to emerge thus helping to improve remediation and rehabilitation strategies beyond current ones that lump together ranges of symptoms. However, it cuts both ways: traditionally neurological disorders, like Parkinson's disease, are being recognized for their high incidence of traditionally psychiatric symptoms, like psychosis and depression (Lerner and Whitehouse, 2002). These symptoms, which are largely ignored in neurology, can be addressed by neuropsychiatry and lead to improved patient care. In sum, it is argued that patients from both traditional psychiatry and neurology departments will see their care improved following a reuniting of the specialties.

Better management model
Schiffer et al. (2004) argue that there are good management and financial reasons for rapprochement.

US institutions
"Behavioral Neurology & Neuropsychiatry" fellowships are accredited by the United Council for Neurologic Subspecialties (UCNS; www.ucns.org), in a manner analogous to the accreditation of psychiatry and neurology residencies in the United States by the American Board of Psychiatry and Neurology (ABPN).

The American Neuropsychiatric Association (ANPA) was established in 1988 and is the American medical subspecialty society for neuropsychiatrists. ANPA holds an annual meeting and offers other forums for education and professional networking amongst subspecialists in behavioral neurology & neuropsychiatry as well as clinicians, scientists, and educators in related fields. American Psychiatric Publishing, Inc. publishes the peer-reviewed Journal of Neuropsychiatry and Clinical Neurosciences, which is the official journal of ANPA.

International organizations
The International Neuropsychiatric Association was established in 1996. INA holds congresses biennially in countries around the world and partners with regional neuropsychiatric associations around the world to support regional neuropsychiatric conferences and to facilitate the development of neuropsychiatry in the countries/regions where those conferences are held. Prof. Robert  Haim Belmaker is the current President of the organization whereas Prof. Ennapadam S Krishnamoorthy serves as President-Elect with Dr. Gilberto Brofman as Secretary-Treasurer.

The British NeuroPsychiatry Association (BNPA) was founded in 1987 and is the leading academic and professional body for medical practitioners and professionals allied to medicine in the UK working at the interface of the clinical and cognitive neurosciences and psychiatry.

Recently, a new non-profit professional society named Neuropsychiatric Forum (NPF) was founded. NPF aims to support effective communication and interdisciplinary collaboration, develop education schemes and research projects, organize neuropsychiatric conferences and seminars.

See also
 American Neuropsychiatric Association
 Cognitive neuropsychiatry
 Neurology
Neurogenetics
 Neuropsychology
 Psychiatry
Psychiatric genetics
 Psychoneuroimmunology

References

 Arciniegas DB, Kaufer DI; Joint Advisory Committee on Subspecialty Certification of the American Neuropsychiatric Association; Society for Behavioral and Cognitive Neurology. Core Curriculum for Training in Behavioral Neurology and Neuropsychiatry. J Neuropsychiatry Clin Neurosci. 2006 Winter;18(1):6-13. 
 Barrett, T.B., Hauger, R.L., Kennedy, J.L., Sadovnick, A.D., Remick, R.A. & Keck, P.E, McElroy, S L, Alexander, L., Shaw, S.H., & Kelsoe, J. (2003) Evidence that a single nucleotide polymorphism in the promoter of the G protein receptor kinase 3 gene is associated with bipolar disorder" Molecular Psychiatry 8, 546−557.
 Becker, A.E. (2004) Television, Disordered Eating, and Young Women in Fiji: Negotiating Body Image and Identity During Rapid Social Change. Culture, Medicine and Psychiatry, 28(4): 533–559.
 Bell, V., Halligan, P.W., Ellis, H.D. (2006). Explaining delusions: a cognitive perspective. Trends in Cognitive Sciences,10(5), 219–26.
 Ferenczi, S. (1921) Psychoanalytical observations on tic. International Journal of Psychoanalysis, 2: 1-30.
 Gamazo-Garran, P., Soutullo, C.A. & Ortuno, F. (2002) Obsessive compulsive disorder secondary to brain dysgerminoma in an adolescent boy: a positron emission tomography case report. Journal of Child and Adolescent Psychopharmacology, 12, 259–263.
 Green, M.F. (2001) Schizophrenia Revealed: From Neurons to Social Interactions. New York: W.W. Norton.
 Kaye, W.H., Bailer, U.F., Frank, G.K., Wagner, A., & Henry, S.E. (2005). Brain imaging of serotonin after recovery from anorexia and bulimia nervosa. Physiology & Behaviour, 86(1-2), 15-7
 Koch, C. & Laurent, G. (1999). Complexity and the nervous system" Science 284(5411), 96–8.
 Lerner, A.J., & Whitehouse, P.J. (2002) Neuropsychiatric aspects of dementias associated with motor dysfunction. Washington, DC: American Psychiatric (pp 931–937)
 Linden, D. E. J. (2006). How psychotherapy changes the brain – the contribution of functional neuroimaging" Molecular Psychiatry 11, 528–38.
 Marr, D. (1982). Vision: A Computational Approach. San Francisco: Freeman & Co.
 Mayberg, H.S. (1997). Limbic-cortical dysregulation: a proposed model of depression. Journal of Neuropsychiatry and Clinical Neurosciences, 9, 471–481.
 Mocellin, R., Walterfang, M., & Velakoulis, D. (2006) Neuropsychiatry of complex visual hallucinations. Australian and New Zealand Journal of Australian and New Zealand Journal of Psychiatry, 40, 742-751
 Rempel-Clower, N.L., Zola, S.M., Squire, L.R., & Amaral, D.G. (1996). Three cases of enduring memory impairment after bilateral damage limited to the hippocampal formation" Journal of Neuroscience 16, 5233–5255
 Robertson, M.M. (2000). Tourette syndrome, associated conditions and the complexities of treatment" Brain 123(3), 425–462.
 Ross, C.A., Margolis, R.L., Reading, S.A.J., Pletnikov, M., & Coyle, J.T (2006). Neurobiology of Schizophrenia" Neuron 52, 139–153.
 Sabshin, M. (1990). Turning points in twentieth-century American psychiatry" American Journal of Psychiatry 147(10),1267-1274.
 Sachdev, P.S. (2005). Whither Neuropsychiatry? Journal of Neuropsychiatry and Clinical Neurosciences,17,140-141.
 Saxena, S., Brody, A.L., Schwartz, T.M., & Baxter, L.R. (1998). Neuroimaging and frontal-subcortical circuitry in obsessive-compulsive disorder. British Journal of Psychiatry,173(35), 26–37.
 Schiffer, R.B, Bowen, B., Hinderliter, J., Hurst, D.L., Lajara-Nanson, W.A., & Packard, R.C. (2004). Neuropsychiatry: A Management Model for Academic Medicine. Journal of Neuropsychiatry and Clinical Neurosciences, 16, 336–341.
 Shapiro, A.K., Shapiro, E., Wayne, H., & Clarkin, J. (1973). Organic factors in Gilles de la Tourette's syndrome. British Journal of Psychiatry, 122, 659–664.
 Shergill, S. S., Brammer, M. J., Williams, S., Murray, R.M., & McGuire, P.K. (2000). Mapping auditory hallucinations in schizophrenia using functional magnetic resonance imaging" Archives of General Psychiatry 57, 1033 -1038.
 Singer, H.S. (1997). Neurobiology of Tourette syndrome. Neurologic Clinics, 15, 357–379.
 Tienari, P., Wynne, L. C., Sorri, A., Lahti, I., Läksy, K., Moring, J., Naarala., M, Nieminen, P., & Wahlberg K. (2004) Genotype–environment interaction in schizophrenia-spectrum disorder: long-term follow-up study of Finnish adoptees. British Journal of Psychiatry, 184, 216–222.
 Uher, R., & Treasure, J. (2005) Brain lesions and eating disorders. Journal of Neurology, Neurosurgery & Psychiatry, 76, 852–7.
 Vawter, M.P., Freed, W.J., & Kleinman, J.E. (2000). Neuropathology of bipolar disorder" Biological Psychiatry 48, 486–504.

External links

Subspecialty Certification
 Behavioral Neurology & Neuropsychiatry, United Council for Neurologic Subspecialties, USA

Journals
 The Journal of Neuropsychiatry and Clinical Neurosciences
 Neuropsychiatric Disease and Treatment
 Clinical Neuropsychiatry: Journal of Treatment Evaluation
 Cognitive Neuropsychiatry

International/National Organizations
 Neuropsychiatric forum
 Neuropsychiatric forum - facebook
 American Neuropsychiatric Association
 The British Neuropsychiatry Association
 Royal College of Psychiatrists, Special Interest Group in Neuropsychiatry (SIGN)
 International Neuropsychiatric Association
 Neuropsychiatry in New Zealand
 Society for Behavioral and Cognitive Neurology

Specific Neuropsychiatry Programs
 Royal Melbourne Hospital Neuropsychiatry Unit
 Neuropsychiatry Program, British Columbia, Canada
 University of Pennsylvania Neuropsychiatry Program
 University of Chicago Neuropsychiatry Program
 Neuropsychiatry Program at Sheppard Pratt, USA

 
Neurology
Psychiatric specialities
Treatment of bipolar disorder